Ernst von Hessen-Philippsthal-Barchfeld (January 28, 1789 Barchfeld - April 19, 1850, Schloss Augustenau Herleshausen) was a German noble and Russian General of the Cavalry.

Biography 
Ernst von Hesse-Filipsthal-Barchfeld was born on January 28, 1789, in Barchfeld in Thuringia (Germany), as son of Landgrave Adolph (1742-1803) by marriage to Princess Louise of Saxe-Meiningen (1752-1805).

When his homeland was overrun by the French, he fled to Russia and was admitted into Russian service as lieutenant colonel in the 6th Jaeger Regiment on May 29, 1808.

On October 23, 1811, Hesse-Filipstal-Barchfeld was dismissed from service for health reasons but re-admitted on June 23, 1812, with the promotion to colonel and the appointment in the cavalry. He took part in the Patriotic War of 1812 for the liberation of Europe from Napoleon.
He was seriously wounded on August 29, 1812, at the Battle of Borodino when his leg was torn off by a cannonball.

On August 22, 1826, he was promoted to lieutenant general.

On September 9, 1836, at his own request, he was released from service with the rank of general from cavalry and with the right to wear a uniform; in addition, as a sign of the special favor of Tsar Nicholas I, he was awarded the Order of St. Alexander Nevsky for excellent service.

He travelled to Great Britain, where his cousin, Queen Adelaide of Saxe-Meiningen, supported him in finding a good craftsman for an artificial leg. Ernst von Hessen became an Honorary Knight Grand Cross in the Order of Bath and after King William IV died, he was present at the Coronation of Queen Victoria.  

Ernst von Hesse-Philipsthal-Barchfeld died on April 19, 1850, in Herleshausen.

Sources
 the article in the German Wikipedia, Ernst von Hessen-Philippsthal-Barchfeld.''

1789 births
1850 deaths
House of Hesse
Russian commanders of the Napoleonic Wars
Recipients of the Order of Alexander Nevsky
Knights Grand Cross of the Order of the Bath
Sons of monarchs
German amputees